Mark Rourke (born 5 October 1968) is a Canadian diver. He competed at the 1984 Summer Olympics and the 1992 Summer Olympics.

References

External links
 

1968 births
Living people
Canadian male divers
Olympic divers of Canada
Divers at the 1984 Summer Olympics
Divers at the 1992 Summer Olympics
Divers from Montreal
Commonwealth Games medallists in diving
Commonwealth Games silver medallists for Canada
Divers at the 1990 Commonwealth Games
Medallists at the 1990 Commonwealth Games